The Waterfront Line is a light rail line of the RTA Rapid Transit system in Cleveland, Ohio, running from Tower City Center downtown, then north and northeast to  station, adjacent to the Cleveland Municipal Parking Lot. The Waterfront Line is the newest rail line in Cleveland, having opened in 1996. The 2.2 mile (3.5 km) line is unique in that it is an extension of the Blue and Green lines, but has its own naming designation. All RTA light rail lines use overhead lines and pantographs to draw power.

History
The line opened on July 10, 1996, coinciding with Cleveland's bicentennial celebration which took place later in the year. The line had a total cost of $70.9 million and was funded by a combination of bonds, grant money from the Ohio Department of Transportation, and local RTA funding. Service on the Waterfront Line was suspended indefinitely in 2021, after previously being suspended in October 2020. Plans call for opening in time for the 2023 Cleveland Browns season.

Route description 
From South Harbor, the lines extends generally west-southwest adjacent to the former New York Central Railroad tracks, now owned by Norfolk Southern. Notable destinations along the line include the Rock and Roll Hall of Fame and FirstEnergy Stadium. Trains will stop at Amtrak's Cleveland Lakefront Station upon request.

The line continues along an elevated loop, allowing it to turn from west-southwest to south-southeast, cross over the Norfolk Southern tracks and travel along the east bank of The Flats. The route passes through three grade crossings.

The line then turns east and climbs up from The Flats in two cuts on either side of the Red Line. It merges onto the Red Line tracks and travels through . Through service between the Waterfront Line and the Blue and Green Lines is provided at Tower City.

From April 2010 through May 2013, RTA completely eliminated weekday regularly scheduled Waterfront Line service due to low ridership and trains ran on the line only on weekends and for special events. Though seven-day-a-week service on the line was restored, a number of trains continue to use Tower City as a western terminus.

Tower City is the major station on all RTA Rapid Transit lines. It is the main station serving downtown Cleveland and it provides a convenient transfer point between the Red Line and the Blue and Green Lines.

Future extensions 
Plans have been drawn up to loop the Waterfront Line back through downtown to Tower City along city streets, but it seems unlikely to move forward in the near future. With the completion of the HealthLine project, a new heavy rail line has been proposed that will connect Rocky River and Euclid. There has also been a proposal to extend the Waterfront line, from the current South Harbor (municipal parking lot at East 14th Street) eastward along the lakefront, to the Glenville or Collinwood neighborhoods or to Euclid or beyond. This eastward expansion is still a part of the Cleveland Planning Commission's Lakefront Development proposal.

An additional station on the Waterfront Line section that loops over the NS tracks, is a part of nearly every plan for that area. Initially, the Cleveland World Trade Center would have had the station in the lobby of the facility, then the Eaton Corp headquarters, but neither project was built. Currently, the announced Lakefront Redevelopment plan has the proposed station as an integral part.

Service

Blue and Green Line trains operate from approximately 3:40 a.m. to 1:00 a.m. daily. On weekdays, each line operates every 10 minutes during rush hour and every 30 minutes at other times. Service between Tower City and Shaker Square operates every 5 minutes during rush hour and every 15 minutes at other times. Service on the Waterfront Line is limited to approximately every three westbound trains from 6:35 a.m. to 8:50 a.m. and again from 3:35 p.m. through 7:20 p.m. Between 8:50 a.m. and 3:35 p.m. and again between 7:20 p.m. and 10:20 p.m., all westbound trains travel along the Waterfront Line. No Waterfront Line service is provided between 10:45 p.m. and 6:35 a.m.

On weekends, each line operates every 30 minutes. Service between Tower City and Shaker Square operates every 15 minutes and all westbound trains from 9:20 a.m. through 10:20 p.m. operate on the Waterfront Line.

Rail replacement bus
During rail shutdowns, RTA uses replacement buses signed as route 67R. These shuttle buses run between Tower City and South Harbor on surface streets.

Stations

All stations are located within Downtown Cleveland.

References

External links

Routes - Greater Cleveland Regional Transit Authority - Rail
Jon Bell - Cleveland, Ohio: The Waterfront Line
Northern Ohio Railway Museum

 
Light rail in Ohio
Standard gauge railways in the United States
600 V DC railway electrification
Railway lines opened in 1996
1996 establishments in Ohio